The Parco Natura Viva is a safari park and zoo in Bussolengo, Veneto, northern Italy, created by Alberto Avesani and his wife in 1969 over an area of .

Gallery

References

External links

Official website (English version)

Safari parks
Zoos in Italy
Tourist attractions in Veneto
Parks in Veneto
Buildings and structures in Veneto
Zoos established in 1969
1969 establishments in Italy